Woodland Plantation is a historic plantation house and farm complex located near Carlisle, Union County, South Carolina, United States. It was built about 1850, and is a two-story, Greek Revival style clapboard structure. It features a front porch with square columns that have windows on all four sides. The complex includes buildings dating from 1850 to about 1950. They include a storehouse, a smokehouse, a carriage house, a bull pen, a cotton gin house, a privy, a hay barn, a calf barn, an office, a dairy milking parlor, and a silo.

It was added to the National Register of Historic Places in 2001.

References

Plantations in South Carolina
Plantation houses in South Carolina
Farms on the National Register of Historic Places in South Carolina
Houses on the National Register of Historic Places in South Carolina
Greek Revival houses in South Carolina
Houses completed in 1850
Houses in Union County, South Carolina
National Register of Historic Places in Union County, South Carolina